The history and development of tanks in the Royal Canadian Armoured Corps can be broken down into smaller categories: their origin during World War I; the interwar period; World War II; the Cold War; and the modern era.

Overview

Originally formed as the Canadian Cavalry Corps in 1910, Canada's first tank units were not raised until late in 1918. Initially, these units were considered to be part of the Machine Gun Corps and the 1st Canadian Tank Battalion; 2nd Canadian Tank Battalion and the 3e Bataillon de chars d'assaut were all too late to join the fighting in the First World War. However, the 1st Canadian Tank Battalion was still training in Mark V tanks in the U.K. when the Canadian Tank Corps was finally authorized two days after the armistice.

The first tanks since the First World War did not arrive until a few Vickers Mark VI light tanks appeared the year before Canada went to war with Germany again. From these modest beginnings, the modern Canadian Armoured Corps began on 13 August 1940. Initially, the Canadian Armoured forces brokered a deal to obtain scrap iron on behalf of the Canadian Government because isolationist laws prohibited the U.S. from foreign arm sales. At the time, there were no tanks available to be acquired from Britain. Therefore, 219 US M1917 tanks, a First World War design, were obtained at scrap prices. They were sufficient to begin some tank training and familiarisation, but were of very limited combat use. Events of the Second World War later thrust Canada into large scale tank production with thousands of Valentine, Ram, and Grizzly tanks and their armoured variants being produced.

Canada would also go on to build modern armoured fighting vehicles that served during the Cold War and the War in Afghanistan.

Canadian Tanks

Valentine Tank

After the fall of France, it was decided the nascent Canadian armoured divisions would be equipped by tanks produced in Canada. To form the 1st Army Tank Brigade, Valentine tanks were ordered. This British design was to be built in Canada. Aside from the necessary adjustments to the design to incorporate local engineering standards and available components, the Canadian Valentines used a GMC engine. This engine, being an improvement over the original, was later applied to British production. Even before the loss of the majority of the United Kingdom's tank force in France in 1940 after Dunkirk, it was recognised that tank production in the UK at the start of the war was insufficient and capacity in the US was taken for British needs. So it was necessary that if Canada was to equip with tanks they would have to be manufactured locally. In June 1940 the Canadian Pacific Railway's Angus Shops in Montreal, as the only large firm with spare capacity, had received a contract to produce 300 partially fitted out Valentine tanks for the British; this was followed later with one for 488 complete tanks for Canada. 
However, the Valentine was an infantry tank and Canada required a cruiser tank for its recently formed armoured division. In the end 1,940 Valentines were produced by CPR most of which were supplied to the USSR. Although the Valentine used a number of American produced parts, its reliance on British components, difficulties in adapting its manufacture to North American methods, and other problems such as limitations to the availability of the right type of armour plate affected Valentine production. 
In practice, Canada never used most of the 1,400 Valentines they built as they were supplied under lend-lease to the Soviet Union.

Ram Tank

The Canadian Joint Committee on Tank Development concluded in September 1940 that its cruiser tank should be based on a US rather than a British design. This would be quicker and allow it to use components already in production for the US design. In early 1941 the 1st Tank Brigade was sent to Britain and equipped with the Matilda infantry tank. For the formation of two armoured divisions it was expected that 1,200 cavalry tanks were needed. The United Kingdom was not in a position to supply them, as it had shortfalls in supply for its own needs. This meant that Canada had to develop its own production. To this end a tank arsenal was set up under the management of a subsidiary of a US firm engaged in tank production. This Canadian indigenous tank design would become the standard armoured vehicle for the Canadian army. The result was the Ram cruiser tank, based on the chassis and running gear of the US M3 Lee; Rams were produced by the Montreal Locomotive Works (MLW) from 1941 to 1943.

Except for the Badger flame thrower tank conversion of the Ram tank and other variants that were in action in NW Europe, the Ram tank did not go to war with the Canadian Armoured Divisions. The decision was made to use the new Sherman tank as standard equipment. The Ram's main contribution to the war effort was to fully equip large armoured units formed in Canada and the U.K. with a modern tank it could use to conduct essential tactical training prior to the invasions in Italy and Normandy. The Ram was produced in numerous variants, the most notable being the Kangaroo Armoured Personnel Carrier.

Variants of the Ram Tank

 Tank Cruiser, Ram Mk I: Ordnance QF 2 pounder / 40mm gun (171 rounds).
 Tank Cruiser, Ram Mk II
 Early production: Mk III QF 6 pounder (57 mm) gun with 92 rounds.
 Late production: Mk V six-pounder. Auxiliary turret and sponson door removed. Browning .303 in (7.7 mm) machine gun fitted in ball mount.
 Badger: A flamethrower equipped tank. The first Badgers were Ram Kangaroos with the Wasp II flamethrowing equipment (as used on the Universal Carrier) installed in place of the bow MG. Later models were turreted Rams with the equipment in place of the main gun.
 Ram Kangaroo: Ram with turret removed to give an armoured personnel carrier capable of carrying 11 battle-ready troops as well as the two crew.
 Ram OP/Command (84): An armoured vehicle to function as a mobile observation posts for the Forward Observation Officers (FOO) of Sexton self-propelled gun units, based on Ram Mk II. The gun was replaced by a dummy, and two Wireless Set No. 19 radios were fitted with a No. 58 set. Crew of six. They were built from the last 84 Rams off the production line in 1943.
 Ram GPO: Like OP but with special equipment for "Gun Position Officers" of self-propelled artillery regiments. Had Tannoy loudspeakers mounted.
 Sexton "25-pdr, SP, Tracked": Self-propelled artillery vehicle armed with QF 25 pounder gun in open-topped superstructure.
 Ram Ammunition Carrier: Also called "Wallaby", an armoured ammunition supply vehicle, converted as for the Kangaroo but used to carry 25-pdr ammunition for Sexton.
 Ram ARV Mk I: Armoured recovery vehicle created by adding winch gear added to Ram Mark I .
 Ram ARV Mk II: ARV based on Ram Mk II. Jibs and earth spade added, turret replaced by dummy.

Grizzly

The M3 was succeeded by the superior M4 Sherman. The Allies agreed to standardise on the M4, and MLW began producing the Canadian version, the Grizzly tanks in August 1943. The Grizzly's suspension used 17-tooth drive sprockets and CDP tracks. In comparison, the M4 used 13 tooth drive sprockets. The CDP track was lighter and simpler than the standard US tracks and did not require rubber, which was scarce since the Japanese advance into Southeast Asia. The Canadian Grizzly tank production halted when it became apparent US production would be sufficient. Instead, MLW produced the Sexton self-propelled gun Mk II. The Sexton Mk II used the Grizzly chassis, with the upper hull modified to carry the Commonwealth standard QF 25 pounder gun. The Sexton was the Commonwealth counterpart to the US M7 Priest. A small batch of Grizzly medium tank was fitted with an Ordnance QF 17-pounder for training but none saw action.

Cougar

Starting with the introduction of the U.S.-designed and built Sherman tank, Canada began a tradition of acquiring U.S., British and then later German made armour to equip the Canadian Army. Often there were revisions to the original specification driven by Canadian requirements. It wasn't until the late 1970s that an armoured vehicle was fielded by Canadian Armoured Regiments that was developed and built in Canada. Although not a Main Battle Tank, the Cougar AVGP - manufactured at GM Diesel Division in London, ON (now part of General Dynamics Land Systems) was envisioned. The AVGP was the first Canadian built AFV in service since the Second World War. The amphibious Cougar was a direct Fire Support Vehicle (Wheeled) FSV(W) variant of the AVGP (Armoured Vehicle General Purpose). It was based on the Swiss MOWAG 6X6 Piranha hull with a 76 mm main gun mounted in a British FV101 Scorpion Tank turret. Cougars entered service in the late 1970s in Canadian based regular and reserve Armoured Regiments. They were intended as a quick air transportable fighting vehicles and used by the CAST Brigade for service in Norway and later with the 1st Canadian Division committed to NATO's CENTAG. They were too light to be effective against MBTs however the end of the Cold War meant they were used in stability operations in Bosnia and Somalia and relegated to training the tank crews in Canada that later received repatriated Leopard C1 tanks from the Canadian Forces in Germany that were disbanded in 1994.

Coyote

The experience gained by the Cougar and AVGP program evolved into the highly successful, made in Canada, LAV-25 and LAV III armoured vehicles that have been deployed by armies around the world. The Coyote Armoured Reconnaissance Vehicle is a Canadian produced eight-wheeled armoured reconnaissance vehicle based on and upgraded version of the LAV-25, 203 entered Canadian service by 1996.

Plan to transition to the Armoured Combat Vehicle

As originally conceived in the early 1990s, the Armoured Combat Vehicle (ACV) was intended to replace the AVGP Cougar for the types of missions that it had been called upon to carry out during Operations Other Than War (OOTW) in Somalia and Bosnia. Such a purchase was seen as part of a two-tier equipping strategy - the wheeled 105mm-armed ACV and some other lighter-weight equipment for OOTW and a main battle tank (MBT) and related heavier equipment for warfighting. 

However, by the mid-1990s elements of the Canadian army were envisioning the ACV replacing both the AVGP Cougar and Canada's obsolescent Leopard 1 MBTs as part of a move to a medium-weight wheeled army. In 2003, Canada announced that it would replace its Leopard 1s with lightweight Mobile Gun Systems. This decision was made although the MGS met neither some of the key capabilities sought in the conceptual Canadian ACV nor the futuristic, high technology (and still-not achieved) requirements for a future ACV that had been highlighted only the year before by the Commander of the Canadian Army to a Canadian Parliamentary committee.

Canadian research-wargaming-based operational research studies and other professional public commentators all argued against this move.
The biggest concerns were that the ACV's planned weak armour and firepower meant that it could not manoeuvre in the presence of a modern enemy and that it could only use ambush tactics against modern MBTs and AFVs, becoming in effect a death trap if it tried, at all, to fulfil the MBT role. Operational research also looked at the benefits of giving the ACV a through-the-barrel (TBM) as well as the equivalent of 400mm of additional armour. The research found that such improvements gave the ACV MBT-like firepower but still left it unable to manoeuvre in the presence of a capable enemy.

Operational research also highlighted an additional, unintended consequence of removing MBTs from the Canadian army. Their loss would also remove the tank-based armoured engineering vehicles and bridgelayers as well as the MBT-mounted mine rollers, mine ploughs, and dozer blades which were all needed to deal with enemy obstacles under fire. The study recommended that none of the envisioned LAV-based armoured engineer vehicles should be procured, as they were inferior to the Leopard tank-based engineering vehicles then in service.

Leopard II
Conventional fighting against the Taliban by the Canadian Army in the Panwayi district of Afghanistan in September 2006 led to a rethinking of the ACV plan. A squadron of Leopard 1s was rushed out to Kandahar Province in Afghanistan and arrangements were made for the army to borrow modern Leopard 2 MBTs from Germany for deployment to Kandahar until Canada could buy used Netherlands' Leopard 2s to replace its Leopard 1s. In 2007, Canada abandoned its plan to buy the Mobile Gun System.

List of tanks in the Canadian Army

See also

 Cold War tank formations
 Royal Armoured Corps
 Royal Australian Armoured Corps
 Royal Canadian Armoured Corps
 Royal New Zealand Armoured Corps
 Monarchy of Canada
 List of infantry weapons and equipment of the Canadian military
 List of modern Canadian Army equipment

Notes and references

External links

 
www.wwiivehicles.com
www.militaryfactory.com
www.junobeach.org

 
Cruiser tanks of Canada
World War II armoured fighting vehicles of Canada
World War II medium tanks
Canadian Armed Forces
Military history of Canada